Ian Richard Parmenter OAM is an English-born Australian media professional with a half century experience in newspapers, magazines, television, and radio. Ian is also an author, who presented 450 five-minute programs of the cookery show Consuming Passions on the Australian ABC television network. The program was also broadcast in 19 other countries.

Parmenter was a Fleet Street, London journalist before moving to Australia in 1971. He joined the national broadcaster in Perth and qualified as a TV producer in 1974. He has developed a culinary flair in private life, confessing to having no trade or professional or experience in foodservice.

He has also written several recipe collections and three books, listed below.

On 26 January 2011, Parmenter was awarded the Medal of the Order of Australia for service to the food and tourism industries as an event director, author, journalist and broadcaster.

Publications
 Cooking with Passion (ABC Books)
Bon Appétit With Ian Parmenter (Gore & Osment Publications)
 Sheer Bottled Bliss (HarperCollins)
 All-Consuming Passions: Recipes Gathered from a Lifetime of Loving Food (HarperCollins)

References

External links
About Consuming Passions and Ian Parmenter Australian Broadcasting Corporation, 2009
Ian Parmenter "George Negus Tonight" TV interview, Australian Broadcasting Corporation, 3 September 2003

English television chefs
English emigrants to Australia
Australian television chefs
Year of birth missing (living people)
Living people
English food writers
Recipients of the Medal of the Order of Australia